The METLIN Metabolite and Chemical Entity Database is the largest repository of experimental tandem mass spectrometry and neutral loss data acquired from standards. The tandem mass spectrometry data on over 870,000 molecular standards (as of August 16, 2022) is provided to facilitate the identification of chemical entities from tandem mass spectrometry experiments. In addition to the identification of known molecules it is also useful for identifying unknowns using its similarity searching technology. All tandem mass spectrometry data comes from the experimental analysis of standards at multiple collision energies and in both positive and negative ionization modes.

METLIN serves as a data management system to assist in metabolite and chemical entity identification by providing public access to its repository of comprehensive MS/MS and neutral loss data. METLIN's annotated list of molecular standards include metabolites and other chemical entities, searching METLIN can be done based on a molecule's tandem mass spectrometry data, neutral loss masses, precursor mass, chemical formula, and structure within the METLIN website. Each molecule is linked to outside resources such as the Kyoto Encyclopedia of Genes and Genomes (KEGG) for further reference and inquiry. The METLIN database was developed and is maintained solely by the Siuzdak laboratory at The Scripps Research Institute.

Constantly evolving
Since its initial implementation in the early 2000s, the freely available METLIN website has collected comments and suggestions for improvements from users in the biotechnology, pharmaceutical and academic communities ultimately resulting in functionally useful technology for metabolomics as well as hundreds of thousands of other molecular entities. The METLIN interface allows researchers to readily search the database and characterize metabolites and other compounds through features such as accurate mass, single and multiple fragment searching, neutral loss and full spectrum search capabilities. The similarity searching feature introduced in 2008 was designed to expedite the identification process of unknown molecules.

METLIN has also been used to create a novel multiple reaction monitoring (MRM) library of precursor to fragment ion transitions. The METLIN-MRM transition repository for small-molecule quantitative tandem mass spectrometry was designed to facilitate data sharing across different instruments and laboratories.

The METLIN database is implemented in the cloud to enable users throughout the world. In addition to expanding the tandem mass spectrometry database, METLIN is designed to search tandem mass spectrometry data, precursor mass, chemical formulas, compound names among other search capabilities. METLIN has also been implemented with cognitive computing applications. The tandem MS high-resolution ESI-QTOF MS/MS data on now over 870,000 distinct chemical entities, includes mass spectral collision-induced dissociation data at four different collision energies, in both positive and negative ionization modes.

References

External links 
 

Metabolism
Chemical databases